Lord of the Fries is a card game created by James Ernest and published by Cheapass Games and Steve Jackson Games.  In 2008 Steve Jackson Games released a new edition with revised game components.  In 2015, Cheapass Games released a fourth edition and four expansion decks.
Lord of the Fries takes place at Friedey's: The Fast Food Restaurant of the Damned.  Other games that take place there include Give Me the Brain and Change!.

Gameplay 
Lord of the Fries is set in the kitchen of Friedey's where your main task is to create meals using different food cards to earn points and get rid of cards.  The meals are taken from various menus including those of Ratherbee's Steakhouse, Ghicciaroni's, Friedey's Restaurant, Friedey's Long Wok, Love's Labours Lunch, and the Holiday Menu.  You combine meals with humorous names like Chickacheezabunga, Sheep wit' da Fishes, Lying Dead on the Floor, Manifest Destiny, Penne for Your Tots, Synaptic Relay Deteriorator, An Unbearable Likeness of Beans, Godfather, Bovine Spongiform Yum, Yum, Yum!, the enormous Magna Carta with a side of fries, and the Lord of the Fries.  

In 2015, the game was relaunched in a fourth edition with first printings having a bonus deck from "McFrye's Coffee Shop."  Four expansions are available, with more designed and not yet released:  "Long Wok on Short Pier," "Las Cabezas," "McPubian's," and "Ghicciaroni's," each with different decks and different restaurant themes.

Awards 
Lord of the Fries was in the Games magazine Games 100 list of 2003.

Reviews
Backstab #12

References

External links 
 Lord of the Fries product page at Cheapass Games
 Official online edition at GameTable Online
 

Card games introduced in 1998
Cheapass Games games
Dedicated deck card games